Kemal Yıldırım (born 15 May 1958) is a Turkish former professional footballer and former manager of Adanaspor and amateur team Yıldırımspor. He is one of the most capped players in Süper Lig history.

References

 (as coach)

1958 births
Living people
Sportspeople from Ordu
Turkish footballers
Turkish football managers
Süper Lig players
TFF First League players
Orduspor footballers
Galatasaray S.K. footballers
Zonguldakspor footballers
Adana Demirspor footballers
MKE Ankaragücü footballers
Gençlerbirliği S.K. footballers
Zeytinburnuspor footballers
Bakırköyspor footballers
Gebzespor footballers
Adanaspor managers
Association football midfielders